Dumeni may refer to:

Dumeni, a village in Duruitoarea Nouă Commune, Rîşcani district, Moldova
Dumeni, a village in George Enescu Commune, Botoşani County, Romania
 Dumeni, the Romanian name for Dumeny village, Kostychany Commune, Novoselytsia Raion, Ukraine
Dumeni, is a famous people's name in Namibia, means say something good or positive